"Celebrity" is a song by the Canadian-based band Barenaked Ladies released from their album Everything to Everyone. The song was only released as a single in the United Kingdom, and peaked at #81 there.

The song was written by band members Kevin Hearn, Steven Page, and Ed Robertson.

Track list
"Celebrity"
"Yes! Yes!! Yes!!!"
"War On Drugs" (Demo Version)

Personnel
 Steven Page – lead vocals, acoustic guitar
 Ed Robertson – electric guitar, background vocals
 Jim Creeggan – electric bass, background vocals
 Kevin Hearn – piano, background vocals
 Tyler Stewart – drums

Charts

References

Barenaked Ladies songs
2004 singles
Songs written by Ed Robertson
Songs written by Steven Page
Song recordings produced by Ron Aniello
2003 songs
Reprise Records singles